KRKC (1490 kHz) is an AM radio station broadcasting a Country and Sports format. As of April 2012, the station is also broadcast on 104.9 MHz. The 104.9 signal is FM translator K285FW.  Licensed to King City, California, United States, it serves the South Monterey County area. The station is currently owned by Dimes Media Corporation, and features programming provided from CBS Radio and Skyview Networks CA Headline News and local news and sports covering the Salinas Valley. Local sports play by play covers the four Salinas Valley High Schools Soledad King City Greenfield and Gonzales KRKC's sister station is KC 102  (102.1 KRKC-FM). 1490/104.9 airs Oakland A's baseball, SF 49ers, San Jose Sharks hockey Golden State Warriors basketball and WW1 Thursday Night Sunday Night and Monday Night NFLPlay By Play Coverage. By 2020, K285FW is now defunct

KRKC signed on in 1959 on 1570 kHz with 250 watts daytime only. In 1963 it moved to 1490 kHz so it could stay on the air full-time.

References

External links
FCC History Cards for KRKC

RKC
Country radio stations in the United States
Full service radio stations in the United States